Chronos may refer to:
Chronos, or Chronus, the Greek personification of time
ancient name of the Pregolya River
Chronos (comics), the various characters from comic books that have used this name
Chronos (film), a 1985 IMAX film by Ron Fricke created with custom-built, time-lapse cameras
Chronos (1987 video game), a shoot-em-up arcade game
Chronos (2016 video game), a role-playing game for Oculus Rift
Chronos (EP), an EP by Callejon
Chronos (band), a Russian band
A series of novels by Madeleine L'Engle, beginning with Meet the Austins
chronos, the root password in ChromeOS

See also
Cronus, a Titan, father of Zeus (in Greek mythology)
Chrono (disambiguation)
Cronos (disambiguation)
Khronos (disambiguation)
Kronos (disambiguation)